The S138 class was a group of sixty-five torpedo boats built for the German Kaiserliche Marine (Imperial Navy) and the Ottoman Navy in the early 1900s. Almost all of the boats served with the German fleet, with only four being sold to the Ottoman Empire in 1910. The German and Ottoman boats saw action in World War I, and several were lost. One Ottoman boat successfully torpedoed and sank a British battleship in 1915. In 1917 and 1918, the German members of the class were all renamed to replace the builder prefix with a standardized "T" prefix. Following Germany's defeat, many of the members of the S138 class were scrapped, either after having been seized as war prizes by the victorious Allied powers or by Germany to comply with the naval disarmament clauses of the Treaty of Versailles. Some boats continued in German service through World War II, after which the surviving vessels were all seized as war prizes.

Design

General characteristics and machinery
The boats of the S138 class varied in dimensions, and they gradually increased in size as more vessels were built. The hull for each boat was divided into thirteen watertight compartments, though after , they were reduced to twelve compartments. They had a crew of three officers and seventy-seven enlisted men, though from V150 onward, they had larger crews, with eighty-one enlisted men aboard. When serving as half-flotilla flagships, the boats would have a flotilla leader's staff of four officers and nine enlisted men in addition to the standard crew. The vessels carried a yawl and a dinghy apiece, though later in their careers they carried up to three yawls and the dinghy.

The S138-class boats had a variety of different propulsion systems. Steam was provided by three coal-fired water-tube boilers. The rest of the members of the class received direct steam turbines of various manufacturers, including AEG, Schichau-Werke, Zoelly, Germaniawerft, and Parsons. All of the boats used the same two-shaft arrangement as the other members of the class, with the exception of the boats  through , which were equipped with six Parsons turbines driving three shafts. Steam for both the reciprocating and turbine engines was provided by four water-tube boilers; the boats from S138 through  had four coal-fired models, while the remainder of the class had three such boilers and one oil-fired version.

Each vessel was equipped with two  110-Volt generators for electrical power. Steering was controlled with a pair of rudders, one at the stern and the other in the bow, the latter being retractable.

Armament

The armament for the members of the S138  class changed as more vessels were built. They carried one hundred 8.8 cm shells and four hundred and fifty 5.2 cm rounds. The boats from V150 to  only carried two 8.8 cm SK L/35 guns with two hundred rounds. The remainder of the class carried two 8.8 cm SK L/30 guns, also with two hundred shells.

Throughout their careers, the boats had their armament modified. After World War I, many of the surviving vessels that still carried their older 8.8 cm guns had them replaced with the SK L/45 versions, and T185, T190, and T196 received two  SK L/45 guns.

From  onward, they were equipped with  tubes with five torpedoes. All of these tubes were in single, deck-mounted launchers. In their postwar refit, T185, T190, and T196 had their original tubes replaced with four 50 cm tubes in double, deck-mounted launchers.

Ships

Service history

Several members of the S138 class were lost during World War I in the North and Baltic Seas.  was sunk during the Battle of Heligoland Bight on 26 August 1914, one of the first major naval actions of the war.  accidentally collided with her sister ship  while the pair were cruising in the Jade Bight shortly after midnight on 18 May 1915. V150 sank and 60 of her crew were killed in the accident. On 26 July 1915,  was torpedoed and sunk by the British submarine  in the North Sea. On 17 December 1915,  and the light cruiser  ran into a Russian minefield off Windau; both vessels struck mines and sank, with heavy loss of life. Nearly a third of V191s crew were killed, 25 men, along 250 out of Bremens crew of around 300. A week later, a British mine claimed  on 23 December, though only seven men were killed in the sinking. While on patrol in the North Sea on 26 March 1916,  encountered British naval forces, and the British light cruiser  rammed and sank G194, killing 93 of her crew.  sank after striking a Russian mine in the Baltic on 15 August 1916; 15 of her crew were killed. Two boats struck mines and sank in the North Sea on 7 July 1918. The Muavenet-i Milliye in Ottoman service successfully torpedoed and sank the British pre-dreadnought battleship  on 13 May 1915 during the Dardanelles campaign, killing 570 of her crew.

In 1917 and 1918, the members of the class were all renamed to replace the builder prefix with a standardized "T" prefix. Following Germany's defeat, many of the members of the S138 class were scrapped, either after having been seized as war prizes by the victorious Allied powers or by Germany to comply with the naval disarmament clauses of the Treaty of Versailles, which permitted Germany to retain only a small fleet that included just twelve destroyers and twelve torpedo boats. The older S138-class boats constituted the bulk of those vessels that Germany was permitted to retain, while the more modern, turbine-powered boats were seized. All of the boats were scrapped in the early 1920s, with the exception of T189, which ran aground off the English coast in December 1920.

These boats served in a variety of roles in the 1920s and 1930s. Several of them were renamed and converted for training duties: T139 became Pfeil, T141 became the radio control ship Blitz, T153 became the range-finding training ship Eduard Jungmann. V151 was converted into a fast tugboat and she received the name Comet. T144, T149, T168, and T175 remained in active service and were scrapped in 1926–1927. Blitz, T143, T148, T152, T154 joined them at the breaker's yards between 1930 and 1935. Others, including T156 and T158, continued to serve with the fleet through the 1930s, while T196 became the flagship for the Minesweeper Command in 1938. In 1932, T185 was renamed Blitz and converted into a radio control ship to replace her sistership in that role. T190 was renamed Claus von Bevern in 1938 and was used in experiments.

By the outbreak of World War II in September 1939, only a handful of the class remained in service. T157 was mined and sunk in Neufahrwasser on 22 October 1943 and T156—which had been renamed Bremse in 1944—and T155 were scuttled in the final days of the war. V185 and V196 were taken as Soviet war prizes and were renamed Vystrel and Pronzitelnyy, respectively; their ultimate fate is unknown. Claus von Bevern was seized by the United States and was scuttled in the Skagerrak in 1946. T151 and T153 also became US prizes; they were scrapped in 1948–1949. T155, Bremse, and T157 were all raised after the war and scrapped as well. T139 was still in service with the 24th U-boat Flotilla as of 1944, but records of her ultimate fate have not survived.

Footnotes

Notes

Citations

References

Torpedo boats of the Imperial German Navy
World War I torpedo boats of Germany